Siri Merete Nordeide Grønli (born 17 April 1984) is a Norwegian football defender, the daughter of a football trainer.  She played for IL Høyang before starting school at NTG Bærum (a specialist sports school near Oslo) and joining Asker SK as a 16-year-old.  She was an Asker player from 2000 to 2008 until joining Stabæk Fotball Kvinner (SFK) at the beginning of 2009 with most of Asker's first team.  2012 was her 13th season in the Norwegian elite league, the Toppserien, except for a season in which Asker were demoted (2006).

She played for the Norway Under-23 team in 2007 as a vice-captain.  In April 2009 she joined Norway's senior team for a visit to England for a training match.  In 2010 Stabæk won the Toppserien title, qualifying to play in the UEFA Women's Champions League in 2011.  Stabæk again qualified for the Champions league at the end of 2011.  Also in 2011 Stabæk won the Norwegian Cup Final on penalties after extra time, with Nordeide Grønli kicking the winning goal.  The match can be seen on NRK web-TV.

She has two younger sisters Line (b. 1988) and Gry (b. 1990) who also play in the Toppserien, for different clubs.

References

External links
 Norwegian national team profile 
 Stabæk club profile 

1984 births
Living people
Norwegian women's footballers
Stabæk Fotball Kvinner players
Asker Fotball (women) players
Toppserien players
Norway women's international footballers
Women's association football defenders
People from Høyanger
Sportspeople from Vestland